Malignancy is an American technical death metal band from Yonkers, New York, formed in February 1992.

History 
Malignancy was formed in February 1992 by vocalist Danny Nelson and guitarist Javier Velez. They released their first demo, Eaten Out from Within, in April 1993. After multiple lineup changes and three more demos the band finally secured a deal with United Guttural Records in 1998. Shortly after, the band released their first album, Intrauterine Cannibalism in early 1999. Soon they released an EP, Motivated By Hunger. In 2001 they released a demo compilation CD, Ignorance Is Bliss, released through Primitive Recordings which contains material from Eaten Out from Within, Ignorance Is Bliss, 1998 promo CD and other rehearsal and demo tracks. Cross Species Transmutation was the last EP released on the now defunct label. Originally slated to be a full-length, the band decided to record what they had and Roger J. Beaujard parted ways. Mike Heller was then added to the malignant fold. A year's worth of teaching and practicing ensued for the band to prep Mike for live gigs. After the release the band began a two-year-long search for a new label, which ended with them signing to Willowtip Records in 2006 and releasing a full-length, Inhuman Grotesqueries, on August 7, 2007.  The band released Eugenics, its third full-length, in 2012, their first concept record, it deals with the evolution and devolution of a society in the future. The Epilogue 7-inch, released in 2014 by Haunted Hotel Records, rounds out the story told on Eugenics.

The band completed a demo, Malignant Future, to circulate for a potential new label deal was released October 7, 2016. According to an interview with Ron Kachnic in 2015, the band has ten songs written for a new album, and will record after a deal is secured with a new label.

Members 
Current members
 Danny Nelson – vocals (1992–present)
 Ron Kachnic – guitar (1995–present)
 Mike Heller – drums (2004–present)
 Alex Weber – bass (2020–present)

Former members
 Larry Demlin – guitar (1992)
 Tom Domey – guitar (1992)
 Kevin Chamberlain – drums (1992)
 Javier Velez – guitar (1992–1995)
 Frank Madiao – bass (1992–1995)
 John Marzan – drums (1992–1995)
 Ralph Blanco – guitar (1994–1995)
 Roger J. Beaujard – drums (1995–2003), bass (2009–2013)
 Kevin Hughes – bass (1996)
 Desmond Tolhurst – bass (1996–2001)
 Lance Snyder – guitar (1996), bass (2001–2008)
 Monty Mukerji – bass (2013–2020)

Timeline

Discography

Albums 
Intrauterine Cannibalism (1999)
Inhuman Grotesqueries (2007)
Eugenics (2012)

Compilations 
Ignorance Is Bliss (2001)

EPs and demos 
 Eaten Out from Within (Demo) (1992)
 Rotten Seed (Demo) (1994)
 Ignorance Is Bliss (Demo) (1997)
 Motivated by Hunger (EP) (2000)
 Cross Species Transmutation (EP) (2003)
 Promo 2005 (Demo) (2005)
 Epilogue (7 inch) (2014)
 Malignant Future (EP) (2016)

References

External links 
 

Musical groups established in 1992
American technical death metal musical groups
Death metal musical groups from New York (state)